Wollongong Hospital is the major tertiary referral hospital located in the Wollongong Metropolitan area, New South Wales, Australia. It provides services to the entire Illawarra and Shoalhaven Region, encompassing population of approximately 350,000.

Wollongong Hospital has the capacity to treat complex and specialist cases. It provides all medical specialties including 24/7 cardiac intervention, aged care, Pediatrics, and all surgical specialties except cardio-thoracic surgery.
The emergency Department in Wollongong Hospital is also one of the busiest in New South Wales, with around 50000 case presentations annually.

Wollongong Hospital is also the principal teaching hospital for Wollongong University Graduate School of Medicine and School of Nursing and Midwifery. The hospital is also closely affiliated with the Illawarra Health and Medical Research Institute, providing research opportunities to address regional health issues and to improve clinical practice and health service delivery in the region and beyond.

The hospital is currently undergoing $100 million worth of capital works enchantments which include a new elective surgical center consisting of seven new operation theaters and 60 new surgical beds. Wollongong Hospital will also receive a new 24 bed Intensive Care Unit/ High Dependency Unit, along with a multi-deck car park to accommodate 600 additional car park spaces.  The project is set to be completed in 2015.

References

Hospitals in New South Wales
Wollongong
Teaching hospitals in Australia